The men's heavyweight is a competition featured at the 2022 World Taekwondo Championships, and was held at the Centro Acuático CODE Metropolitano in Guadalajara, Mexico on 17 November 2022. Heavyweights were limited to a minimum of 87 kilograms in body mass.

Results
Legend
DQ — Won by disqualification
R — Won by referee stop contest
W — Won by withdrawal

Finals

Top half

Section 1

Section 2

Bottom half

Section 3

Section 4

References

External links
Draw

Men's 88